Pattanathu Rajakkal is a 1982 Tamil-language action drama film, directed by S. A. Chandrasekhar, starring Vijayakanth and Silk Smitha.

Cast
 Vijayakanth as Vijay
 Silk Smitha as Rekha
 Jaishankar
 Typist Gopu
Thideer Kannaiah
Jocker Thulasi
Master Kajah Sherieef
A. Veerappan 
K. Kannan
S. S. Chandran
 Jaggu
 Amjath Kumar
 Baby Shanthi
 Baby Shakeela

Soundtrack
The music was composed by Shankar–Ganesh.

References

External links

1982 films
1980s Tamil-language films
Films scored by Shankar–Ganesh
Indian action drama films
Films directed by S. A. Chandrasekhar
1980s action drama films